The Roman Catholic Diocese of Parintins is a diocese located in the city of Parintins in the Ecclesiastical province of Manaus in Brazil.

History
 July 12, 1955: Established as Territorial Prelature of Parintins from the Metropolitan Archdiocese of Manaus
 October 30, 1980: Promoted as Diocese of Parintins

Bishops

Ordinaries, in reverse chronological order
 Bishops of Parintins (Roman rite), below
 Bishop Giuliano Frigeni, P.I.M.E. (20 January 1999 – present)
 Bishop Gino Malvestio, P.I.M.E. (9 March 1994 – 7 September 1997)
 Bishop Giovanni Risatti, P.I.M.E. (15 July 1989 – 20 January 1993), appointed Bishop of Macapá, Amapa
 Bishop Arcângelo Cerqua, P.I.M.E. (30 October 1980 – 15 July 1989)
 Prelates of Parintins (Roman Rite), below
 Bishop Arcângelo Cerqua, P.I.M.E. (4 February 1961 – 30 October 1980)
 Fr. Arcângelo Cerqua, P.I.M.E. (later Bishop) (Apostolic Administrator 15 March 1956 – 4 February 1961)

Coadjutor bishop
Giovanni (João) Risatti, P.I.M.E. (1987-1988)

References
 GCatholic.org
 Catholic Hierarchy

Roman Catholic dioceses in Brazil
Christian organizations established in 1955
Parintins, Roman Catholic Diocese of
Roman Catholic dioceses and prelatures established in the 20th century
1955 establishments in Brazil